Hermann Schnell ( 16. September March 1916 – 7 September 1999) was a German organic chemist who developed the first commercial polycarbonate, Makrolon.
Hermann Schnell studied chemistry at the University of Freiberg. His supervisor was Hermann Staudinger a well-known polymer chemist.

After his phd he worked in the research laboratory of the Bayer AG in Uerdingen, starting in 1946. In 1953 he developed the synthesis of polycarbonates by reacting phosgene with bisphenol A. This material marketed as Makrolon was a commercial success.

References 
 

1916 births
1999 deaths
Academic staff of the University of Freiburg
20th-century German chemists
Organic chemists
Polymer scientists and engineers